The kings of Axum ruled an important trading state in the area which is now Eritrea and northern Ethiopia, from approximately 100–940 AD.

Zenith of the Kingdom of Axum

Later kings

Notes

See also
 Axum
 Lists of office-holders
 List of emperors of Ethiopia

References

Axum
 
Axum
Axum
Eritrea history-related lists